The Calliope mini is a single-board computer developed for educational usage at German primary schools. The goal of the initiative is to provide all pupils as of grade three of primary schools in Germany with a Calliope mini free of charge.

Background 

Calliope mini was inspired by the BBC micro:bit, which was distributed to pupils of grade seven in Great Britain. The non-profit Calliope gGmbH is responsible for developing and maintaining the Calliope mini.

The name "Calliope mini" is a reference to Kalliope, a daughter of Zeus and the muse who presides over eloquence, science and epic poetry.

Hardware 
 Nordic nRF51822 Multi-protocol Bluetooth® 4.0 low energy / 2.4 GHz RF SoC
 32-bit ARM Cortex M0 processor (16 MHz)
 16kB RAM
 256kB Flash
 Bluetooth low energy
 5x5 LED matrix display
 Accelerometer, Gyroscope, Magnetometer (Bosch BMX055)
 MEMS Microphone
 DC Motor Driver (TI DRV8837)
 Piezo Speaker
 RGB LED (WS2812B)
 2 programmable buttons
 Serial interface (USB + configurable ports)
 PWM output
 4 banana plug / crocodile clip connections
 4 analog inputs
 8-11 Input / Output Connections (depending on software configuration)
 SPI + I2C
 USB Micro B connection (programming and power supply)
 JST battery connector (3.3V)
 Banana / crocodile clip connection for 3.3V (output)
 2 Grove connectors (I2C + serial / analog)
 NXP KL26z (USB and power supply)
 Flash program memory (optional)

See also 

 BBC micro:bit
 Raspberry Pi
 Arduino
 Open Roberta

References

External links 

 Official website
 Calliope mini on GitHub

Single-board computers